AC3 Thunderbolt (Australian Cruiser III) was a cruiser tank designed and built in Australia in World War II as the successor to the AC1 Sentinel. Like the Sentinel the AC3 featured a one piece cast hull and turret. The AC3 featured a much improved design over the AC1 with better armour protection, a more powerful engine, and most importantly increased firepower.

The program was terminated in 1943 before any production vehicles were completed.

History
Even before the AC1 Sentinel began rolling off the assembly line in August 1942 it had been seen that the 2 pounder was becoming less effective as tank armour increased in thickness on new and improved enemy tanks. To address this a 25 pounder (87.6 mm, 3.45 in) gun-howitzer was fitted to a turret on the second prototype Australian cruiser tank hull and successfully test fired on 29 June 1942. With this success decided to use the 25 pounder as a tank gun. The 25 pounder, redesigned as a tank gun, was tested on 10 October 1942, the work on the overhead recoil system would later prove useful for the design of the Short 25 Pounder.

Mounted in a fully traversable turret larger than that of the AC1 but using the same  turret ring, it was slightly cramped for the turret crew but gave the AC3 both armour-piercing capability as well as an effective high explosive round. The 40 volt electrical turret traverse system of the AC1 was replaced by a more powerful 110 volt system.

The hull machine gun and gunner were removed from the design to make room for stowage of the larger 25 pounder ammunition. Powered by the same three Cadillac V8 engines as the AC1, they were now mounted radially on a common crank case and geared together to form the "Perrier-Cadillac", a single 17.1 L, 24 cylinder engine, very similar in some respects to the later A57 Chrysler multibank used in some variants of the US M3 and M4 tanks. While the AC3 shared the same armour basis as the AC1, the hull profile had been greatly redesigned to improve the ballistic shape.

The programme was authorised to build a total of 200 Thunderbolts. Although only one pilot model AC3 had been completed, large scale production of components had been ordered and 150 AC3 hulls cast. New South Wales Government Railways' production line at Chullora work had started on assembling the first 25 AC3 tanks for trials when the programme was terminated in July 1943.

Survivors 

At the end of World War II all but three Australian Cruiser tanks were disposed of by the Australian government. The 65 tanks that were not required to serve as a physical record in war museums in Australia and the UK were sold off by the Commonwealth Disposals Commission. One of the three saved was the only completed AC3 (serial number 8066) which is now located at the Treloar Resource Centre at the Australian War Memorial in Canberra.

An AC3 mockup was assembled from unused AC3 armour castings and a mix of AC3 and AC1 parts at the Melbourne Tank Museum in 1996–97, this piece was sold to a private collector in 2006.

Variants

See also

Tanks of comparable role, performance, and era

 Australia Sentinel
 British Cromwell
 Canadian Ram II
 German Panzer IV
 Hungarian Turán III
 Italian Carro Armato P 40
 Italian P43 (proposal)
 Japanese Type 3 Chi-Nu
 Romanian 1942 medium tank (proposal)
 Soviet T-34
 Swedish Stridsvagn m/42
 United States M4 Sherman

Notes
Footnotes

Citations

References

External links

Australian War Memorial

Cruiser tanks of Australia
World War II tanks of Australia
Military vehicles introduced from 1940 to 1944